Found may refer to:

 Found Aircraft, an aircraft manufacturer based in Ontario, Canada
 Found (album), a 2009 album by American pop/rock band Push Play
 Found (band), an experimental pop band from Edinburgh, Scotland
 Found (2012 film), a horror film
 Found (2021 film), an American-Chinese documentary film
 Found (novel), a 2008 young adult science fiction novel by Margaret Peterson Haddix
 Found object, art created from undisguised, but often modified, objects or products that are not normally considered art
 Found (Rossetti), an unfinished oil painting by Dante Gabriel Rossetti
 Found (horse), Irish-trained thoroughbred racehorse foaled in 2012
 "Found", a 2010 episode of NCIS: Los Angeles
 "Found" (song), a 2016 song by Dan Davidson

See also 
 Founding (disambiguation)
 Foundation (disambiguation)
 Find (disambiguation)